Salvador Giménez Valls born May 31, 1948  in Muro d'Alcoi (County), Spain  is the current Bishop of Lleida  and former Bishop of Menorca in the Roman Catholic Church.

He is a Catholic priest, philosopher and historian who studied at the Pontifical University of Salamanca and obtained Priestly ordination on June 9, 1973.

References

Bishops of Lleida
20th-century Roman Catholic bishops in Spain
1948 births
Living people